Chiropsalmidae is a family of venomous box jellyfish within the class Cubozoa.

Genera
 Chiropsalmus Agassiz, 1862
Chiropsalmus alipes Gershwin, 2006
Chiropsalmus quadrumanus (F. Muller, 1859)
 Chiropsoides Southcott, 1956
 Chiropsoides buitendijki (van der Horst, 1907)

References

 
Chirodropida
Cnidarian families